Matías Facundo Vargas (born 5 November 1996) is an Argentine professional footballer who plays as a forward for CAI.

Career
Estudiantes Unidos were Vargas' first team, where he played in Torneo Argentino C in 2013. A move to CAI soon followed. His club bow came in the Copa Argentina on 6 November 2013 against Guillermo Brown, with Vargas being substituted on after seventy-two minutes and going on to score a ninetieth minute winner in an away win at the Estadio Raúl Conti. Vargas scored his opening league goals for CAI against Cipolletti on 19 April 2015. In total, he appeared for them in seasons in Torneo Argentino A, Torneo Federal A and Torneo Federal B between 2013 and 2018 to take his overall statistical tally to sixty-two matches and fourteen goals.

On 30 June 2018, Vargas completed a move to Primera B Nacional side Guillermo Brown. Hugo Barrientos selected the forward for his debut on 20 July during a Copa Argentina defeat to Tigre. He departed the club on 4 January 2019, which preceded a return to CAI of the Torneo Regional Federal Amateur.

Career statistics
.

References

External links

1996 births
Living people
Sportspeople from Bariloche
Argentine footballers
Association football forwards
Torneo Argentino C players
Torneo Argentino A players
Torneo Federal A players
Comisión de Actividades Infantiles footballers
Guillermo Brown footballers